Matthias Predojević (born 14 November 1976) is a German/Serbian football midfielder.

Club career
Born in Reutlingen, West Germany, he played with FC Bayern Munich II in 1995–96 before joining Karlsruher SC. Predojević failed to make any appearance with Karlsruher SC in the 1996–97 Bundesliga and played mostly for the second team. In 1997, he moved to Serbia, and after a spell with RFK Novi Sad he joined FK Milicionar in the 1997–98 First League of FR Yugoslavia. Next he left Milicionar and moved to Portugal and played with second-level side União Madeira After playing in the Portuguese island of Madeira, he returned to continental Europe and joined K.S.V. Roeselare from Belgium. In January 2000 he returned to Germany and signed with Berliner FC Dynamo. Later he played in Serbia with FK Javor Ivanjica and then signed with FK Vojvodina in 2001. In summer 2002 he moved to Netherlands and played with MVV Maastricht in the 2002–03 Eerste Divisie. Then he played with SSV Reutlingen 05 in the season 2003–04.

References

External links
 

1976 births
Living people
People from Reutlingen
Sportspeople from Tübingen (region)
Footballers from Baden-Württemberg
Association football midfielders
German footballers
Serbian footballers
FC Bayern Munich II players
Karlsruher SC players
RFK Novi Sad 1921 players
FK Milicionar players
C.F. União players
K.S.V. Roeselare players
Berliner FC Dynamo players
FK Javor Ivanjica players
FK Vojvodina players
MVV Maastricht players
SSV Reutlingen 05 players
Eerste Divisie players
Oberliga (football) players
German expatriate footballers
Expatriate footballers in Serbia and Montenegro
Expatriate footballers in Portugal
German expatriate sportspeople in Portugal
Expatriate footballers in Belgium
German expatriate sportspeople in Belgium
Expatriate footballers in the Netherlands
German expatriate sportspeople in the Netherlands